Aigars Kalvītis (born 27 June 1966) is a Latvian businessman and a former politician who was the Prime Minister of Latvia from 2004 to 2007. Currently he is the president of Latvian Ice Hockey Federation and the Chairman of the Board of Latvian gas company Latvijas Gāze. He is the Chairman of the Council of Latvian telecommunications company Tet.

Education 
In 1984 Kalvītis graduated from Riga Secondary School No. 41. In 1992 he graduated from the Latvian University of Agriculture with a bachelor's degree in economics and in 1995 he graduated with a magister degree in economics. In the same year he studied in the University of Wisconsin.

Political career

Political activities up to 2004 
Kalvītis was one of the founders of People's Party of Latvia in 1997 and was first elected to Saeima, the Latvian parliament, in 1998. He served as the minister of agriculture from 1999 to 2000 and the minister of economics from 2000 to 2002. Kalvītis was reelected to Saeima and became the leader of the parliamentary faction of the People's Party in 2002.

Prime minister 
On 2 December 2004, he became the Prime Minister of Latvia. He was the prime minister of Latvia until his resignation on 5 December 2007.

Kalvītis government 
Kalvītis at first led a coalition government consisting of his own People's Party, the New Era Party, the Union of Greens and Farmers and the Latvia's First Party. In April 2006, the New Era Party left the government and Kalvītis led a minority coalition government consisting of the other three parties.

His governing coalition retained power in the 7 October 2006 parliamentary election, winning a slight majority of seats and becoming the first government since Latvian independence in 1991 to be re-elected. It consisted of the People's Party, Union of Greens and Farmers, the Latvia First/Latvian Way Party, and For Fatherland and Freedom/LNNK. For Fatherland and Freedom/LNNK was added after the 2006 elections, and strengthened the coalition's majority to 59 of the 100 seats. Meanwhile, the People's Party became the largest party in Parliament. Kalvītis became its chairman.

Retirement from politics 
On 7 November 2007, Kalvītis announced that he would step down as prime minister on 5 December, after encountering widespread opposition to his dismissal of the head of the anti-corruption bureau, Aleksejs Loskutovs, in the previous month. He accordingly met with President Valdis Zatlers on 5 December and announced his resignation, along with that of his government. According to Kalvītis, speaking on television on the same day, this was necessary to "cool down hot heads". Kalvītis remained in office in a caretaker capacity until the appointment of his successor Ivars Godmanis. He decided to leave politics altogether on 1 April 2009, by putting down his member of Saeima mandate.

Business career 
From 1992 to 1998, he was a manager and Chairman of the Board of various agriculture related businesses. And after his political career he has been Chairman of the Council of various well-known companies like Tet (2009), Latvijas Balzams (2009-2015), and Chairman of the Board of enterprises like Hockey Club Dinamo Riga (2010-2015), the operator of Latvian LNG infrastructure Conexus Baltic Grid (2017) and Latvijas Gāze (2015). He became the president of the Latvian Ice Hockey Federation in October 2016, to succeed Kirovs Lipmans.

Personal life 
His wife is Kristīne Kalvīte. He has three sons Kārlis, Roberts and Rūdolfs.

See also
 First Kalvītis cabinet
 Second Kalvītis cabinet

References

1966 births
Living people
Businesspeople from Riga
People's Party (Latvia) politicians
Prime Ministers of Latvia
Ministers of Economics of Latvia
Ministers of Agriculture of Latvia
Deputies of the 7th Saeima
Deputies of the 8th Saeima
Deputies of the 9th Saeima
Latvian ice hockey people
Latvia University of Life Sciences and Technologies alumni
Recipients of the Order of the Cross of Terra Mariana, 1st Class
Politicians from Riga